Matyáš is a Czech masculine given name, cognate to Matthew.

Notable people with the name include:

 Matyáš Bělohradský (born 2001), Czech figure skater
 Matyáš Démar (born 1991), Czech volleyball player
 Matyáš Hanč (born 2004), Czech football player
 Matyáš Jachnicki (born 1999), Czech volleyball player
 Vojtěch Matyáš Jírovec (1763–1850), Bohemian composer
 Matyáš Klang (born 1991), Czech rower
 Jindřich Matyáš Thurn (1567–1640), Czech (Bohemian) nobleman
 Josef Matyáš Trenkwald (1824–1897), Czech/Austrian painter
 Matyáš Vágner (born 2003), Czech football player
 Matyáš Žďárský (1856–1940), Czech/Austrian skiing pioneer

It is also sometimes found as a surname:

 Imrich Matyáš (1896–1974), Czechoslovak activist

See also
 Mátyás, Hungarian given name

Czech masculine given names